Caylee Watson (born October 10, 1994) is a swimmer from the United States Virgin Islands. She competed at the 2016 Summer Olympics in the women's 100 metre backstroke; her time of 1:07.19 in the heats did not qualify her for the semifinals.

References

External links
 

1994 births
Living people
United States Virgin Islands female swimmers
Olympic swimmers of the United States Virgin Islands
Swimmers at the 2016 Summer Olympics
21st-century American women